Zinaida Semenova (born 19 March 1962) is a retired female long-distance runner from Russia. She set her personal best in the women's marathon on October 7, 2001, in Saint Paul, Minnesota, clocking 2:26:51. Semenova is a three-time winner of the annual Twin Cities Marathon and the shared woman's course record holder along with Irina Permitina, who also ran an official time of 2:26:51 in 2004.

Achievements

References

External links 

1962 births
Living people
Russian female long-distance runners
Russian female marathon runners
World Athletics Championships athletes for Russia
20th-century Russian women
21st-century Russian women